Troed-yr-hen-riw is a hamlet in the community of Blaenrheidol, Ceredigion, Wales, which is 70 miles (112.6 km) from Cardiff and 170.2 miles (273.8 km) from London. Troed-yr-Henriw is represented in the Senedd by Elin Jones (Plaid Cymru) and is part of the Ceredigion constituency in the House of Commons.

Etymology 
The name derives from the Welsh language: "The foot of the old slope".

References

See also 
 List of localities in Wales by population

Villages in Ceredigion